Bjørnar Valstad (born 27 April 1967) is a Norwegian former orienteering athlete who has won 4 World Orienteering Championships gold medals.

Valstad ran for the Norwegian club Bækkelagets SK in Oslo. He previously represented Nydalens SK, NTHI and IL Stjørdals-Blink. From 2007 to 2014 he was the secretary-general of the Norges Orienteringsforbund. He retired from international orienteering at the end of the 2004 season where he became world champion in both the long and relay events, despite this he failed to make the Orienteering World Cup final round in Germany.

He is married to former orienteering athlete Hanne Staff. They are living in Nittedal with their two daughters born 2006 and 2009. 

Valstad got his degree in electrical engineering at the Norwegian University of Science and Technology 
Since 2014 Valstad is head of department for electrical engineering at Kuben Upper Secondary School in Oslo.

Achievements 

World Orienteering Championships
 Gold, Long Distance, 2004 Sweden
 Gold, Relay Event, 2004 Sweden
 Gold, Classic Distance, 1999 Great Britain
 Gold, Relay Event, 1999 Great Britain
 Silver, Middle Distance, 2003 Switzerland
 Silver, Relay Event, 2001 Finland
 Silver, Relay Event, 1991 Czechoslovakia
 Bronze, Short Distance, 1997 Norway
 Bronze, Relay Event, 1997 Norway
 Bronze, Short Distance, 1995 Germany

European Orienteering Championships
 Silver, Classic Distance, 2002 Hungary
 Bronze, Classic Distance, 2000 Ukraine

Orienteering World Cup
 First, Overall Individual World Cup 2002
 Third, Overall Individual World Cup 1998
 Gold, Classic Distance, 2002 Switzerland
 Gold, Sprint Distance, 2002 Norway
 Gold, Classic Distance, 1998 Ireland
 Silver, Short Distance, 2002 Sweden
 Silver, Classic Distance, 1998 Great Britain
 Silver, Classic Distance, 1998 Estonia
 Silver, Classic Distance, 1996 Lithuania
 Bronze, Classic Event, 2002 Czech Republic
 Bronze, Short Distance, 1998 Great Britain
 Bronze, Classic Distance, 1998 Poland
 Bronze, Short Distance, 1998 Finland

World Games
 Gold, Relay Event, 2001 Japan

References

External links

1967 births
Living people
Norwegian orienteers
Male orienteers
Foot orienteers
World Orienteering Championships medalists
Norwegian orienteering coaches
Norwegian sports executives and administrators
Competitors at the 2001 World Games
World Games gold medalists